Ilmari Vesamaa (4 December 1893, Artjärvi – 24 January 1973) was a Finnish track and field athlete who competed in the 1920 Summer Olympics. In 1920 he was eliminated in the semifinals of the 3000 metre steeplechase competition as well as of the 5000 metres event. He finished 14th in the individual cross country event. Due to being not one of the best three performer of the Finnish team he was not awarded with a gold medal in the team cross country competition.

References

1893 births
1973 deaths
People from Orimattila
People from Uusimaa Province (Grand Duchy of Finland)
Finnish male long-distance runners
Olympic athletes of Finland
Athletes (track and field) at the 1920 Summer Olympics
Finnish male steeplechase runners
Olympic cross country runners
Sportspeople from Päijät-Häme